Administrative, territorial, and municipal division of the Altai Republic is regulated by the Law #12-15 of the Altai Republic, passed by the State Assembly—El Kurultai on June 2, 1999, with subsequent amendments.  The Law established the following classification:
administrative units
district—an administrative unit under jurisdiction of the Republic, governing a certain territory.  Districts are governed from an administrative center.
selsovet—a municipal unit under jurisdiction of a district comprising one or several settlements.
dyuchina—national administrative unit for local self-governing of the native peoples.  Dyuchinas would have the same administrative status as selsovets, but they have not been implemented in practice.
inhabited localities:
urban settlements:
city/town;
urban-type settlement; not implemented in practice;
resort settlement; not implemented in practice;
suburban (dacha) settlement; not implemented in practice
rural settlements—settlements that do not satisfy the criteria for urban settlements:
selo;
settlement;
village;
other types of rural settlements
closed settlement—territories under the federal government management with travel and residency restrictions; usually military objects.  Closed settlements have not been implemented in practice.

Changes in the overall administrative and territorial structure of the Republic are authorized by the State Assembly—El Kurultai.  All changes must later be registered in the Russian Classification of Objects of Administrative Division on the federal level.

Administrative and municipal divisions

References

 
Altai Republic